Sprig may refer to:

Sprig (agriculture), a type of plant cutting used for propagation
Sprig (character), a fictional character from the Grey Griffins series
Sprig, another name for the bird northern pintail (Anas acuta)
Sprig Plantar, a fictional character in the American animated series Amphibia